The Churches Conservation Trust, which was initially known as the Redundant Churches Fund, is a charity whose purpose is to protect historic churches at risk, those that have been made redundant by the Church of England. The Trust was established by the Pastoral Measure of 1968. The legally defined object of the Trust is "the preservation, in the interests of the nation and the Church of England, of churches and parts of churches of historic and archaeological interest or architectural quality vested in the Fund ... together with their contents so vested".  The charity cares for over 350 churches.  The Trust is financed partly by the Department for Culture, Media and Sport and the Church Commissioners, but grants from those bodies were frozen in 2001, since when additional funding has come from other sources, including the general public. In the 12 months ending 31 March 2010 the charity's income was £6,161,653, and its spending was £6,035,871.  During that year it had 44 employees, and used the services of 2,000 volunteers.  The charity is run by a board of trustees, who delegate the day-to-day management to a chief executive and his senior management team.

The Trust's primary aim is to ensure that the buildings in its care are weatherproof and to prevent any deterioration in their condition.  The majority of the churches remain consecrated, and many are occasionally still used for worship.  Local communities are encouraged to use them for appropriate activities and events, and the buildings provide an educational resource, allowing children and young people to study history and architecture. Nearly 2 million people visit the Trust's churches each year.  As most of the churches remain consecrated, they are used for occasional services where this is practical, and some are venues for concerts and other purposes.

This list contains the 56 churches preserved by the Churches Conservation Trust in Southeast England, consisting of those in the counties of Oxfordshire, Buckinghamshire, Greater London, Berkshire, Hampshire, Surrey, Kent, West Sussex, and East Sussex. The churches range in age from the Anglo-Saxon All Saints Church, West Stourmouth, to the newest church in the list, Holy Trinity Church, Privett, which was built between 1876 and 1878. All the churches are designated by English Heritage as listed buildings, most of them in Grades I and II*.

Key

Churches

See also
For lists of churches preserved by the Churches Conservation Trust in other regions see:
East of England
English Midlands
Northern England
Southwest England

Notes

The dates given for construction are often not exactly known. Where this is the case the century of first construction of the existing building is given.

References

Architectural history lists

Lists of churches in England